Uncanny Tales may refer to one of the following publications:

 Uncanny Tales (American pulp magazine), an American pulp magazine
 Uncanny Tales (Canadian pulp magazine), a Canadian pulp magazine
 Uncanny Tales (comic), a horror comic published by Atlas Comics in the 1950s
 Uncanny Tales (Sheckley), a 2003 collection of short stories by Robert Sheckley